Kane John Ashcroft (19 March 1986 – 10 October 2015) was an English footballer who played for York City.

He died at the age of 29 in October 2015 from cancer.

References

External links

1986 births
2015 deaths
Footballers from Leeds
English footballers
Association football midfielders
York City F.C. players
English Football League players
National League (English football) players
Deaths from cancer in England